Tokeba Bayou is a stream in the U.S. state of Mississippi.

Tokeba is a name derived from the Choctaw language purported to mean "bitter", "first", or "stream bend".

References

Rivers of Mississippi
Rivers of Yazoo County, Mississippi
Mississippi placenames of Native American origin